MBS may refer for:

People
 Mohammed bin Salman (born 1985), crown prince and prime minister of Saudi Arabia
 Mohan Bikram Singh (born 1935), Nepalese politician

Places
 MBS International Airport (IATA code: MBS), Freeland, Michigan, US
 Marina Bay Sands, a resort in Singapore

Education

Universities
 Alliance Manchester Business School (Alliance MBS), University of Manchester, England
 Mannheim Business School, University of Mannheim, Germany
 Melbourne Business School, University of Melbourne, Australia
 Munich Business School, Germany
 MBS College of Crete, Heraklion, Crete, Greece
 MBS School of Planning and Architecture, New Delhi, India
 Montpellier Business School (MBS), Montpellier, France

Schools
 Methodist Boys' School, Kuala Lumpur, Malaysia
 Marylebone Boys' School, London, England

Other education
 Master of Business Studies, an academic qualification
 Malaysia Bible Seminary, Malaysia

Organizations
 Mercey Brothers Sound, a record label
 Moroccan British Society, an organization in the United Kingdom
 Motor Bus Society, a non-profit organization in the US

Broadcasters
 Mainichi Broadcasting System, television and radio broadcaster in Osaka, Japan
 MBS TV
 MBS Radio (Japan)
 Maharlika Broadcasting System, the name used by Filipino state broadcaster People's Television Network from 1980 to 1986
 Maritime Broadcasting System Limited, branded as MBS Radio, a private Canadian broadcasting company 
 Mutual Broadcasting System, a former American radio network
 CFTF-DT, whose operating company is Télévision MBS, Inc.

Science and technology
 Metropolitan Beacon System, a metropolitan 3-D geolocation system
 Micro Bill Systems, an online collection service considered to be malware
 Minimum breaking strength, related to the working load limit

Computing
 Megabits per second (Mb/s), a data-rate unit (eight times less than MB/s)
 Megabytes per second (MB/s), a data-rate unit (eight times more than Mb/s)
 Multibody simulation, a method of numerical simulation

Other uses
 Majority bonus system, a semi-proportional voting system
 Medical Benefits Schedule, or MBS, a schedule of fees set by Medicare (Australia)
 MBS (hip hop), an Algerian rap group
 Mortgage-backed security, a type of asset-backed security
 Medal for Bravery (Silver), second rank in the Order of the Medal for Bravery in Hong Kong
 Sarangani language (ISO 639 code: mbs)

See also
 MB (disambiguation)